According to the Bible, Jochebed was a daughter of Levi and mother of Miriam, Aaron and Moses. She was the wife of Amram, as well as his aunt. No details are given concerning her life. According to Jewish legend, she is buried in the Tomb of the Matriarchs, in Tiberias. In the New Testament, she is praised for her faith in God.

Birth of Moses
The story of Jochebed is thought to be described in the Book of Exodus (2:1–10) – although she is not explicitly named here. (Her name is first mentioned in Exodus 6:20.) She lived in Egypt, where the descendants of Israel were being oppressed. The Pharaoh had decreed that all their baby boys were to be thrown into the Nile, because he feared that they might become too powerful. When Moses, her youngest child, was born, Jochebed hid him for three months until she could hide him no longer. To save her son's life, she waterproofed a basket and put the child in it. Jochebed placed Moses in a basket and released him in the flow of River Nile. The basket fell in the hands of the Pharaoh's daughter who was bathing in the river. Moved with compassion when she discovered the child, she decided to adopt him. The "sister" of the child (presumed to be Miriam), who had come forward, suggested to find her a Hebrew woman to nurse the child. The Pharaoh's daughter agreed and so Miriam called her mother, who was appointed to take care of him. Thus Jochebed nursed her son until he was old enough and brought him to the Pharaoh's daughter, who adopted him as her son. The story continues with Moses, who grew up to become the leader of the Exodus, leading his people out of the land of Egypt.

Relation to Amram
According to the Book of Numbers, Jochebed was born to Levi when he lived in Egypt. Amram was the son of Kohath, who was a son of Levi. This would make Jochebed the aunt of Amram, her husband. This kind of marriage between relatives was later forbidden by the law of Moses. Jochebed is also called Amram's father's sister in the Masoretic text of Exodus 6:20, but ancient translations differ in this. Some Greek and Latin manuscripts of the Septuagint state that Jochebed was Amram's father's cousin, and others state that she was Amram's cousin. In the Apocryphal Testament of Levi, it is stated that Jochebed was born, as a daughter of Levi, when Levi was 64 years old.

In Jewish rabbinic literature 

Jochebed is identified by some rabbis in the Talmud with Shiphrah, one of the midwives described by the book of Exodus as being ordered by Pharaoh to kill the new-born male children. In making this identification, the rabbis interpret the houses, with which the Book of Exodus describes God as having compensated the midwives, as having been those of priesthood and of royalty; these houses are interpreted by the Talmudic rabbis as allegorical references to Jochebed's sonsMoses and Aaron respectively. 

The Exodus Rabbah argues that when the Pharaoh instructed midwives to throw male children into the Nile, Amram divorced Jochebed, who was three months pregnant with Moses at the time, but Miriam soon persuaded him to marry Jochebed again; it goes on to argue that the Egyptians estimated the date that Moses would be due to be born by counting nine months from the start of this marriage, hence allowing Jochebed to hide him for the three months that were overestimated. The Targum Pseudo-Jonathan identifies Jochebed as also having been wife of Elitzaphon Ben Parnach, and the mother of Eldad and Medad; the text is ambiguous as to when this marriage occurred in relation to the marriage(s) to Amram.

Jochebed's name is given various allegorical interpretations; the Leviticus Rabbah identifies her as the person named in the Book of Chronicles as Jehudijah, by arguing that the name should be interpreted as meaning the Jewess, in reference to her founding the Jewish nation by disobeying the Pharaoh's order to dispose of the firstborn males.

Some rabbinic literature attempts to resolve the textual discrepancy in which the Torah lists 34 children of Leah born in Mesopotamia, stating that two were dead, and then immediately states that there were 33 in total, by arguing that the figure referred only to the surviving children, and that Jochebed was the 33rd; however, since the Book of Numbers describes Jochebed's birth as occurring in Egypt, this necessitated the further rabbinic argument that Jochebed was born exactly on the border of Egypt, in the gateway of the city. Biblical scholars have instead simply proposed that the discrepancy in the enumeration of Leah's children is due to the list not originally having included Dinah, who was added by a later editor to introduce consistency with the story of the Rape of Dinah.

According to traditional rabbinic biblical chronology, Moses was 80 years old when the Exodus occurred, the Israelites had been in Egypt for 210 years in total, and thus in combination with the rabbinical claim that Jochebed was born on the border of Egypt, as her parents had entered it, this would require Jochebed to have been 130 years old when she gave birth to Moses; Rabbinical literature regards this to have been alluded to be the biblical description of the dedication of the Israelite altar, at which 130 shekel weight of silver was offered.

According to Josephus Flavius the birth of Moses was an extraordinary event because Jochebed was spared the pain of child-bearing due to both her and Amram's piety. The Haggadah extends this miraculous nature to Moses' conception by marking as 130 the age of Jochebed at conception. Several rabbinic commentaries attest to this and comment that maidenhood was restored to Jochebed at the time of her marriage to Amram. The restoration of maidenhood also included the resumption of her fertility.

Textual criticism
Textual scholars attribute the genealogy to the Book of Generations, a hypothetical document originating from a similar religiopolitical group and date to the priestly source. According to some Biblical scholars, the Torah's genealogy for Levi's descendants is actually an aetiological myth reflecting the fact that there were four different groups among the Levites – the Gershonites, Kohathites, Merarites, and Aaronids; Aaron – the eponymous ancestor of the Aaronids – couldn't be portrayed as a brother to Gershon, Kohath, and Merari, as the narrative about the birth of Moses (brother of Aaron), which textual scholars attribute to the earlier Elohist source, mentions only that both his parents were Levites (without identifying their names). Some Biblical scholars suspect that the Elohist account offers both matrilinial and patrilinial descent from Levites in order to magnify the religious credentials of Moses.

It has been proposed by a number of Biblical scholars that Ichabod and Jacob may ultimately be linguistic corruptions of Jochebed, and possibly once have referred to the same individual.

Family tree
According to the masoretic text, Jochebed's family tree is as follows:

According to the Septuagint however, Jochebed would be a cousin of Amram or Kohath:

Islamic view

Along with the parting of the Red Sea, the burning bush and the Ten Commandments: The Quran relates the story of Moses with some added details and slight differences. His mother, Jochebed, and her efforts to save the baby Moses are recounted. 

Stories of unusual events during the pregnancy of Aminah, mother of the Islamic prophet Muhammad, are compared with the similar experiences of Jochebed when she was carrying Moses. The significance of this comparison is understood to spring from the affinity of Arabic folklore for Hebrew traditions.

In popular culture
The film The Ten Commandments calls her "Yoshebel". She was portrayed by Martha Scott.

She appears briefly in The Prince of Egypt under the name 'Yocheved', voiced by (and resembling) Israeli vocalist Ofra Haza.  In the film, she sings a lullaby to baby Moses as she sets the basket carrying him adrift in the river, also pleading the river to deliver Moses "somewhere he can live free".  Ofra sang the lullaby in 18 languages for the film's dubbing (including her native Hebrew).

In 2014 film Exodus: Gods and Kings, she was portrayed by British Actress Anna Savva. She was only shown onscreen at the time that Moses was exiled and got to meet his biological mother.

Notes

References

Ancient Egyptian Jews
Judaism and women
Book of Exodus people
Levites
Incest in mythology
Moses
Family of Aaron
Women in the Hebrew Bible

Tribe of Levi